Ali Reza Nourizadeh (born 24 June 1949 in Tehran) is an Iranian scholar, literary figure, journalist, political activist and an expert on Iranian contemporary history.

Career
Nourizadeh is a political refugee from Iran. After fleeing to the United Kingdom, he obtained his PhD from the University of London in International Relations.
He is a monarchist.

Nourizadeh himself has been active in the Iranian journalistic milieu since 1967. Before Iranian Revolution, he was editor of Ettela'at, a strongly pro-Shah Iranian newspaper.

After  Ali-Reza Pahlavi, youngest son of the Shah, killed himself in 2011 in Boston, Nourizadeh called it "a tragedy for the Iranian people".

He is a senior researcher and director at the Centre for Arab & Iranian Studies strongly opposed to the Islamic Republic of Iran.

Nourizadeh is also a correspondent for Deutsche Welle, a Political Commentator for the radio channel Voice of America, a senior writer for the London-based Saudi-owned newspaper Al-Sharq Al-Awsat.

In June 2013, three days after Hassan Rouhani was elected as President of Iran, Israeli news website Ynetnews reported Nourizadeh's claim that Rouhani's son "committed suicide in protest at his father's close connection with Supreme Leader Ali Khamenei".

Assassination attempt
Ali Reza Nourizadeh was targeted by Iranian national Mohammad Reza Sadeqinia in 2009 while visiting the British capital, according to a cable from the US embassy in Grosvenor Square.

Sadeqinia attempted to hire a hitman to assassinate Iranian-American broadcaster Jamshid Sharmahd, and as a result, he was detained in California on suspicion of soliciting murder. The FBI alerted UK authorities to the threat since his conduct toward Nourizadeh was consistent with his interactions with Sharmahd, and Nourizadeh was subsequently warned. The threat materialized as a result of Nourizadeh's anxiety, which led him to inform the US embassy about his interactions with Sadeqinia.

Personal life
Nourizadeh is also the father of director Nima Nourizadeh, director of the 2012 film Project X and the 2015 film American Ultra, and electronic music producers Omid 16B and Navid.

Works and publications
 1970 - Dar Parvandehaye Ghatlhaye Zanjirei (Farsi Edition)
 1996 - Ba Khoon-e Del Neveshtam با خون دل نوشتم (Farsi Edition]
 2001 - Sounaye Zafaraniyeh (Farsi Edition)
 2002 - Fallahian Mardi Baraye Hame-ye Janayat فلاحیان مردی برای تمام فصول جنایت (Farsi Edition)
 2012 - Folks of Amirieh: Bacheh-Haye Amirieh (Persian Edition)

See also
Chain murders of Iran

References

External links
 Alireza Nourizadeh's homepage
 Guardian article on Nourizadeh suspected of being target by hitman
 BPUR profile
 List of Author's books on Amazon
 Link to Nourizadeh's CNN Interview video
 Nourizadeh Profile at WorldCat

1949 births
Living people
Iranian writers
Iranian journalists
Alumni of the University of London
Iranian emigrants to the United Kingdom
Voice of America people